Mount Mangin is a mountain,  high, standing  northeast of Mount Barre on Adelaide Island, Antarctica. It was discovered by the French Antarctic Expedition, 1908–10, and named by Jean-Baptiste Charcot for the noted French botanist Louis A. Mangin.

References

Mountains of Adelaide Island